"Billy Baxter" is a song by Australian rock group Paul Kelly and the Dots, released on 20 October 1980 as the lead single from the album Talk (1981). It was written by band members Paul Kelly and Chris Langman. It peaked at No. 38 on the Australian Kent Music Report Singles Chart. The song was produced by Joe Camilleri (from Jo Jo Zep & The Falcons) for Mushroom Records. In early November the group performed the track on national pop music TV show, Countdown – it was Kelly's first TV appearance. The song's subject, Billy Baxter, is an Australian musician and was a long term member of Coodabeens Footy Show on ABC Radio National.

Background
Paul Kelly and the Dots had formed in August 1978 in Melbourne from the remains of High Rise Bombers, the Dots underwent line-up changes prior to the release of "Billy Baxter". Their debut single "Recognition" was issued in 1979, under the name The Dots, on an independent label, but had no chart success. "Recognition" line-up were Kelly (vocals), Chris Langman (guitars), Chris Worrall (guitars), Alan Brooker (bass guitar) and John Lloyd (drums). More changes occurred, they signed to Mushroom Records and released "Billy Baxter" on 20 October 1980, which peaked at No. 38 on the Australian Kent Music Report Singles Chart. In early November that year, Paul Kelly & the Dots performed "Billy Baxter" on national pop music TV show, Countdown – it was Kelly's first appearance on television.

Their debut album, Talk followed in March 1981 and peaked at No. 44 on the related albums chart. Kelly was later dissatisfied with his earliest albums: "I wish I could grab the other two and put 'em in a big hole".

The subject of the song, Billy Baxter, is an Australian vocalist (ex-Ghetto Blasters, Big Fans of Jesus, The Hollow Men and solo). He was a Disc Jockey on Melbourne community radio station 3RRR and is a long term member of Coodabeens Footy Show on several Melbourne radio stations since 1981 (3RRR, several versions of ABC and 3AW). Kelly said, "Billy is a very entertaining person. I used quite a bit of him in the song, but it was never meant to be accurately biographical of Billy."

The B-side to the single, "Hard Knocks", was featured in the soundtrack of the 1980 AFI Award nominated film of the same name.

On the Australia Day (26 January) long week-end in 1982, Kelly performed the song at the Mushroom Evolution Concert backed by Jo Jo Zep & The Falcons. The concert celebrated Mushroom Records' 10th anniversary and was held at the Myer Music Bowl. The song appeared on both the triple LP and the video release of the concert of the same name.

Composition and recording
"Billy Baxter" is a ska-influenced song of two minutes and forty-three seconds. It was written by Paul Kelly and Chris Langman. From 1977 to 1978 Kelly and Langman had shared a house in the Melbourne suburb of South Yarra, where according to Kelly, "Chris and I sat around for hours, days playing guitars ... I played him my new songs as they kept coming and we made up tunes together". Kelly and Langman also co-wrote "Leaps and Bounds", which appeared on Paul Kelly and the Coloured Girls' album Gossip (1986). According to the lyrics, Billy Baxter's attributes include: lost limitations, imitations, a thousand faces, a lover, a gambler, a lesson for all the crew, a hungry heart, love to burn, in love with abandon but never loses control, walks right through disaster and still whole, plays pantomimes.

Kelly had met Joe Camilleri (from Jo Jo Zep & The Falcons) when the latter was looking for someone to co-write songs with, Kelly gave Camilleri "Only the Lonely Heart" (aka "Only the Lonely Hearted") and "Hand Me Down". Camilleri recommended Kelly to Mushroom Records and put up the money to produce the group's debut album, Talk. The song was produced by Camilleri for Mushroom Records. Kelly remembered "I'd done my back badly and couldn't stand or sit for any length of time, so I had to do my vocals lying on the floor... If I could gather up every copy of that first record and bury them all in a big hole, I would. But that's no fault of Joe's". The B-side, "Hard Knocks", was produced by Trevor Lucas (of United Kingdom folk group Fairport Convention).

Reception
Reviewed at the time of release in Roadrunner, the song was deemed, "Unlistenable. A sort of reggae David Watts/Billy Hunt, it reeks of a calculated attempt at commercial success."

Track listing

Personnel
Paul Kelly and the Dots members
Paul Kelly – vocals
Paul Gadsby – bass guitar
Chris Langman – guitars
John Lloyd – drums
Chris Worrall – guitars
Chris Dyson – guitar, vocals
Tony Thornton – drums
Alan Brooker – bass guitar
Tim Brosnan – guitar
Michael Holmes – guitar

Recording details
Producer – Joe Camilleri ("Billy Baxter"), Trevor Lucas ("Hard Knocks")
Remixer – Camilleri ("Hard Knocks"), Jim Barton ("Billy Baxter")
Engineer – Jim Barton
Studio – AAV Australia, Melbourne

Charts

References

External links
 "Billy Baxter" 30-second sample of live version by Paul Kelly backed by Jo Jo Zep & The Falcons from the Mushroom Evolution concert performed on 26 January 1982, stored at Music Australia site for National Library of Australia. Note: requires browser to be in 32-bit mode and .asx compatible.

Songs about musicians
1980 singles
Paul Kelly (Australian musician) songs
Songs written by Paul Kelly (Australian musician)
1980 songs
Mushroom Records singles